Guernsey Rugby Football Club is an amateur rugby union team who play at Footes Lane in St Peter Port on the Channel Island of Guernsey. The club was formed in 1928. The club runs two senior teams, a veterans side and a colts side. Their first XV, the Guernsey Raiders currently play in level 4 (National League 2 East) following their promotion from London & South East Premier at the end of the 2019–20 season. The Guernsey Raiders Ladies team plays in level 4, Women's National Challenge South East South 1.

History 
Guernsey RFC were founded in 1928 and started playing in English leagues in 1987. As a result of the high transport costs, the Rugby Football Union (RFU) funds the opposition team's travel when they play away at Guernsey as well as funding Guernsey's travel to England for league matches. Until 2010, the Hampshire Rugby Football Union also granted additional funding to help with the transport costs.

In 2011, Guernsey had a new clubhouse constructed which was visited by The Princess Royal during her visit to Guernsey in November. In 2012, after being promoted from London 1 South, Guernsey became the only fully amateur team in National League 3 London & SE. Guernsey host annual "ladies days" during their season.

Siam Cup 
Guernsey annually play Jersey Reds in the inter-insular Siam Cup, the second oldest rugby honour contested after the Calcutta Cup.  The host venue alternates yearly between Footes Lane and Jersey's St. Peter. The Siam Cup match is viewed as a season finale by the two clubs as the match is played after the regular league season has finished. In 2010, a Guernsey player was found guilty of assaulting two Jersey players after a Siam Cup game. Since Jersey began employing professional players they have dominated the inter island game. From 2016 in an attempt to even up the game only professional players who had been in Jersey for three years will be eligible for the annual match.

Guernsey Ladies Rugby team 
In 2012, Guernsey's women's team applied to join the English leagues. However the Rugby Football Union rejected their application on logistical grounds and also because the RFU Council had previously passed a moratorium to not admit to the English leagues, any further teams from offshore.

In 2014–15 the decision was overcome and Guernsey Ladies (GLR) joined the Women's National Challenge South East South 2 league, which they won, earning promotion to Women's National Challenge South East South 1 for the 2015–16 season. In 2016-17 the Women again won the top position in their league becoming champions after winning 12 of the 14 season's matches.

Men's seasons 

 2021–22 National League 2 South - level 4 - 10th
 2020–21 National League 2 South - level 4 - season cancelled
 2019–20 London & South East Premier - level 5 - 2nd promoted without play-offs
 2018–19 National League 2 South - level 4 - 15th relegated
 2017–18 London & South East Premier – level 5 - runners up promoted via play-offs
 2016–17 National League 3 London & SE - level 5 - 5th
 2015–16 National League 3 London & SE – level 5 - 6th
 2014–15 National League 3 London & SE – level 5 - 10th
 2013–14 National League 3 London & SE – level 5 - 5th
 2012–13 National League 3 London & SE – level 5 - 8th
 2011–12 London 1 South – level 6 - 1st promoted
 2010–11 London 2 South West – level 7 - 1st promoted
 2009–10 London 2 South West – level 7 - 2nd‡

 2008–09 London 3 South West – level 7 - 7th‡
 2007–08 London 3 South West – level 7 - 4th
 2006–07 London 3 South West – level 7 - 5th
 2005–06 London 3 South West – level 7 - 10th
 2004–05 London 3 South West – level 7 - 2nd 
 2003–04 Hampshire 1 – level 8 - 1st promoted
 2002–03 Hampshire 1 – level 8 - 3rd
 2001–02 Hampshire 1 – level 8 - 3rd
 2000–01 Hampshire 1 – level 8 - 5th
 1999–00 Hampshire 1 – level 8 - 8th
 1998–99 Hampshire 1 – level 8 - 8th

‡ Leagues re-branded, with London 3 South West renamed London 2 South West

Men's current season results

Women's seasons 

 2020–21 Women's National Challenge 1 South East South 1 - level 4 -
 2019–20 Women's National Challenge 1 South East South 1 - level 4 - 5th
 2018–19 Women's National Challenge South East West 1 - level 4 - 3rd
 2017–18 Women's Championship South West 2 - level 3 - 8th relegated

 2016–17 Women's National Challenge South East South 1 – level 4 - 1st promoted 
 2015–16 Women's National Challenge South East South 1 – level 4 - 4th
 2014–15 Women's N C South East South 2 – level 5 - 1st promoted

Ladies current seasons results

Current standings

Honours

Men's
Siam Cup champions (15 times)
Hampshire Bowl winners: 2002
 Level 8 Hampshire 1 champions: 2003–04, promoted to level 7
 Level 7 London Division 2 South West champions: 2010–11, promoted to level 6
 Level 6 London Division 1 South champions: 2011–12, promoted to level 5
 LSE Premier v SW Premier promotion play-off winners: 2017–18, promoted to level 4

Women's
 Level 5 Women's National Challenge South East South 2 champions: 2014–15, promoted to level 4
 Level 4 Women's National Challenge South East South 1 champions: 2016–17, promoted to level 3

Notable players 
Luke Jones – originally played for Guernsey before moving to English Premiership team, Leicester Tigers and the Cornish Pirates.

See also 
 English rugby union system
 Rugby Football Union for Women

References

External links
Official club website
England Rugby

Rugby union in Guernsey
Rugby clubs established in 1928
Sports teams in Guernsey
1928 establishments in Guernsey